The New Hampshire Academy of Science, Inc. (NHAS) is a not-for-profit 501(c)(3) organization, established to promote science and scientific research in the state of New Hampshire.  The academy was first established in 1919.

The NHAS operates lab spaces in Lyme, New Hampshire for middle and high school students to carry out research during summer and after school programs. Located on the border between New Hampshire and Vermont, NHAS serves students from both states. Through partnership with the Fairbanks Museum and Planetarium (FMP) in St. Johnsbury, Vermont, NHAS has established a student-centered STEM Lab at the FMP. A teacher professional development program has also led to satellite labs at local schools that are supported by the NHAS. 

The NHAS currently has two federal grants to serve secondary school students and teachers: The National Institutes of Health/National Institutes of General Medical Sciences awarded the NHAS a Science Education Partnership grant in 2020 that will continue for 5 years, and a National Science Foundation, Innovative Technology Experiences for Students and Teachers grant that begins in 2022 and will continue for 4 years.  Both grants include comprehensive support for secondary school students to perform authentic research at NHAS STEM facilities in NH and VT and at Colby Sawyer College.

Affiliations
The New Hampshire Academy of Science is affiliated with the:

American Association for the Advancement of Science (AAAS)
Colby-Sawyer College
Dartmouth College
Dartmouth Hitchcock Medical Center and Clinics (DHMC) / Dartmouth Health
Fairbanks Museum and Planetarium
National Institutes of Health (NIH)
University of New Hampshire (UNH)

References

External Links 

 Website

Science and technology in New Hampshire
Education in New Hampshire
Non-profit organizations based in New Hampshire
Organizations established in 1919
1919 establishments in New Hampshire